Corrigan-Camden High School is a public high school in Corrigan, Texas, United States. It is part of the Corrigan-Camden Independent School District.

In addition to Corrigan, the district serves the census-designated place of Pleasant Hill, and a section of the city of Seven Oaks.

History 
In 2011, the school was nominated by the Texas Education Agency to be a blue-ribbon school based on their improvements in math over the past five years. On June 7, 2016, the agriculture building at the school caught on fire, which started when a construction crew was working on the building. There were no students and staff inside the building, and everyone inside the other buildings were evacuated. No injuries were reported and the cause of the fire was unknown.

Athletics 
The school mascot is the bulldog, and is classified as a 3A school by the University Interscholastic League (UIL). Athletic programs offered by the school include:

 Football
 Girls' basketball
 Softball
 Track
 Cheerleading
 Volleyball
 Cross country

Notable alumni
 Chase Ford, former NFL player
 LaDarius Hamilton, NFL player
 Ray Woodard, former NFL player

References

External links 
 

Schools in Polk County, Texas
Public high schools in Texas